Full Circle is the ninth studio album by American singer Angie Stone. Initially set for a June 7 release, it was released on July 12, 2019, by Conjunction Entertainment and Cleopatra Records.

Critical reception

AllMusic editor Andy Kellman found that on Full Circle "Stone is at her best here when she is granted material that wouldn't make half as much sense handled by any other artist. These moments include a burning and conflicted throwback ballad with Jaheim ("Gonna Have to Be You"), the strutting summertime groove "Perfect," and the reflectively frank "Neverbride." It gets a little too candid on "Grits," a graphic slow jam in which Stone acts as a voyeuristic sex therapist for a younger couple. The album's slightly reedy mix unfortunately diminishes the richness of Stone's voice."

Singles
"Dinosaur" was released as the first single from Full Circle on March 13, 2019.

Track listing

Charts

Notes

References

2019 albums
Angie Stone albums